Oost-Graftdijk is a village in the Dutch province of North Holland. It is a part of the municipality of Alkmaar, and lies about 11 km west of Purmerend.

History 
The village was first mentioned in 1639 as Oostbuert. The current name means "eastern dike of the (de Vuile) Graft (river)". Oost- (east) has been added to distinguish from West-Graftdijk. Oost-Graftdijk is a dike village which developed in the second half of the 16th century. Around 1870, a basic Mennonite church was built in Oost-Graftdijk.

Gallery

References

Populated places in North Holland
Alkmaar